Vic Elias (1948–2006) was a poet who was born in Chicago, Illinois, and emigrated to Canada in 1979. Settling in London, Ontario, he was a Professor of Applied Mathematics at the University of Western Ontario. He was also an Affiliate Member of the Perimeter Institute for Theoretical Physics in Waterloo, Ontario. In 1997 he received the Edward G. Pleva Award for Excellence in Teaching, UWO's highest teaching award. In addition to his work in mathematics and physics, Vic Elias was an accomplished poet whose work appeared in a number of literary publications including Parchment, Tabula Rasa, and Afterthoughts. He is the author of three full-length collections and one chapbook of poetry. His poems have dealt with his Jewish identity and spiritual themes, humorous anecdotes, and in his final works, his struggle with cancer, which took his life in May 2006.

Books
1991: Reflected Scenery from Where My Eyes Should Be, Moonstone Press 
2004: Drinking with Old Men, South Western Ontario Poetry, 
2006: A Game of Jeopardy, South Western Ontario Poetry,

Chapbooks
2006: The Cataracts of Troy, South Western Ontario Poetry

References

External links
Vic Elias: Publisher Site

American male poets
Writers from Chicago
1948 births
2006 deaths
Chapbook writers
20th-century American poets
20th-century American male writers